A complete list of footballers who have made at least one appearance in an official match for the Belgian football team Cercle Brugge K.S.V.. Second nationalities are shown before the name of the player.

Albania
  Besnik Hasi
 Ylli Shehu

Australia
 Lorenz Kindtner
 Eddie Krncevic
 Dominic Longo
 Andy Vlahos

Belgium

 Jacques Acket
 Maurice Adamson
 Xavier Aelter
 André Aerts
 Ernest Aerts
 Patrick Albert
 Johan Allemeersch
 Germain Alleyn
 Anthony Annicaert
 Albert Antjon
 Kristof Arys
 David Avonture
 Albéric Baelen
 Aimé Baert
 Omer Baervoets
 Dominique Baes
 Louis Baes
 Omer Baes
 Gilbert Bailliu
 Alfons Ballegeer
 Ronny Ballegeer
 Céléstin Bauwens
 Germain Becu
 Roland Beelen
 Ricky Begeyn
 Dirk Beheydt
 Ignace Bekemans
 Albéric Berghman
 Prudent Bettens
 Bernard Beuken
 Daniël Beun
 Arthur Beuselinck
 Eric Beyrens
 Michel Billen
 Robert Billiet
 Johnny Bleyaert
 Maurice Blieck
 Roger Blieck
 Roger Blieck
 Joseph Boereboom
 Roland Boey
 John Bogaert
 Joris Bogaert
 Frederik Boi
 Achille Bonami
 Vital Borkelmans
 Ronny Borloo
 Robert Braet
 Benoit Brilleman
 Jackie Brinckman
 Geert Broeckaert
 Gerard Brulez
 Fernand Bruneel
 Gianni Brunello
 Thomas Buffel
 Jules Bulckaert
 Raoul Bullynck
 Eric Buyse
 Marc Calcoen
 Raymond Callens
 Alex Camerman
 Franky Carlier
 Peter Carly
 Edmond Casteleyn
 Henri Catry
 André Cherlet
 Olivier Claessens
 Adolphe Claeys
 Geoffrey Claeys
 Jean Claeys
 Octave Claeys
 Rik Claeys
 Roger Claeys
 David Coeman
 Geert Coens
 Joseph Cools
 Peter Cooman
 Maurice Coopman
 Davy Cooreman
 Jo Coppens
 Hans Cornelis
 Karel Cornelissen
 Jean Corthouts
 Maurice Couilleit
 Walther Couilleit
 Paul Courant
 Emile Cousin
 Dimitri Craeye
 Willy Craeye
 Georges Crampe
 Maurice Crépain
 Henri Croenen
 Eric Daels
 Albéric Daled
 Bjorn Daeninck
 Eric Damman
 Raymond Danneels
 Rubin Dantschotter
 Willy Dasseville
 Raoul Daufresne
 Jacques Dautricourt
 Réginald Dautricourt
 Georges Daveloose
 Mario David
 Alfons De Backer
 Charles Debbaudt
 Georges Debbaut
 Alex De Beule
 Prosper De Bois
 Gerard De Breuck
 Johan De Buyser
 Marc De Buyser
 Emile De Buysere
 Robert De Buysere
 Jackie De Caluwé
 Jérôme De Caluwé
 Robert De Caluwé
 Alain De Clercq
 Willy De Cock
 Nico Deconinck
 Alphonse Decorte
 Fernand De Corte
 Maurice De Corte
 Pol Decoussemaecker
 Luc Decoussemaecker
 Gino De Craemer
 Aurèle De Decker
 Gilbert De Duytsche
 Maurice Degraeve
 Etienne De Grande
 Albert De Gruyter
 Andy Degryse
 Guy Dejaeghere
 Wouter De Jonckheere
 Dieter Dekelver
 Giovanni Dekeyser
 Albert De Kimpe
 Albert Delaender
 Hervé Delesie
 Artur De Lissnyder
 André Deloof
 Carlos De Loof
 Florent Deloof
 Jacques De Loof
 Michel Deloof
 Richard Deloof
 Dimitri Delporte
 Davy De Maertelaere
 Firmin De Maertelaere
 Léon De Meester
 Sam de Meester
 Noël Demey
 Dirk De Meyer
 Stefaan Demol
 Mathieu Denier
 Alain De Nil
 Ewout Denys
 Fritz Denys
 Edouard Deplancke
 Joachim De Plancke
 Joseph Deplancke
 Peter Depoorter
 Maurice De Preetere
 Victor Derboven
 Joseph De Roo
 Joseph De Rous
 Marcel Desaever
 André De Schepper
 Albert De Sloovere
 Willem De Sloovere
 Philemon Desmaele
 Albéric De Smedt
 André De Smedt
 Edgard De Smedt
 Geert Desmet
 Stijn De Smet
 Georges Desnoeck
 Rik Desplancke
 Carlos De Steur
 Johan De Stickere
 Willy Destordeur
 Tom De Sutter
 Sylvere De Vadder
 Philibert De Vlaeminck
 Gérard Devos
 Guy De Vos
 Marcel De Vos
 Gino Devriendt
 Dirk De Vriese
 Danny Devuyst
 Etienne De Vylder
 Bartel De Waele
 Filip Dewaele
 Jean-Marie Dewalleff
 Patrick Dewispelaere
 Roland De Wispelaere
 Jimmy De Wulf
 Joseph De Wulf
 Léon De Wulf
 Filip D'Haemers
 Kristof D'haene
 André Dhondt
 Stefaan D'Hondt
 Valère Dhooghe
 Dick D'Hoore
 Paul D'Hoore
 Carlos Dierickx
 Sven Dobbelaere
 Guy Droessaert
 Cyrille Druwel
 Gaston Eeckeman
 Gustave Eeckeman
 Walter Elegeert
 Vincent Euvrard
 Bernt Evens
 Joseph Evrard
 Matthias Feys
 Yves Feys
 Marc Flamée
 Didier Frenay
 Jean Pierre Gardin
 Johan Geeraerts
 Charles Geernaert
 Sven Geldof
 Omer Georges
 Hans Gerard
 Jo Gerard
 Daniël Giraldo
 Maurice Goderis
 Georges Goegebeur
 Léon Goegebeur
 Marcel Goeminne
 Fernand Goyvaerts
 Bernard Haazen
 Rudi Haleydt
 Pierre Hanon
 Alain Henderickx
 Wim Henneman
 Maurice Herreboudt
 Raymond Herreboudt
 Benoni Herssens
 Julien Herssens
 André Heyns
 Dirk Hinderyckx
 Joël Hoste
 Marcel Houwen
 Franco Iovino
 Patrick Ipermans
 Pierre Iweins d'Eeckhoutte
 Georges Jacobus
 Walter Jacobus
 Romain Janssen
 Joseph Janssens
 Kevin Janssens
  Nordin Jbari
 Gilbert Kerrebrouck
 Emile Keukelinck
 Roland Keygnaert
 Lucien Kyndt
 Lionel Ladon
 Patrick Lagrou
 Charles Lahousse
 Bert Lamaire
 Raymond Lamaire
 Willy Lambert
 Jürgen Landuyt
 Frans Lantsoght
 Paul Lantsoght
 Raf Lapeire
 Christophe Lauwers
 Frans Lefevere
 Philippe Lejour
 Stanislas Lekens
 Antoon Leleu
 Charles Leleu
 Klaas Lesage
 Willy Leyssens
 Gilbert Libon
 Arthur Liénard
 Joseph Lips
 Frans Loos
 Geert Lootens
 Albert Lowyck
 Frans Lowyck
 Jean Lucker
 Raoul Lucker
 Luc Maenhout
 Gaston Maes
 Gino Maes
 Omer Maes
 Steven Maes
 Jerry Maeseele
 Grégoire Maieu
 Henri Mallet
 Dieudonné Martens
 Florimond Martens
 Louis Martens
 Jan Masureel
 Albert Masyn
 Germain Masyn
 Gustave Matthijs
 Laurent Matthys
 Gregory Mertens
 Filip Messens
 Gustaaf Messens
 Franky Mestdagh
 Harold Meyssen
 Albert Michiels
 Marcel Mitchell
 John Moelaert
 Bernard Moerman
 Rudy Moerman
 Peter Mollez
 Urbain Monte
 Maurice Moreeuw
 Willy Mortier
 Marc Mouton
 Gino Moyaert
 Joseph Muyle
 Ignace Muylle
 Albert Naert
 Léon Naessens
 Maurice Naessens
 Raymond Naessens
 Arne Naudts
 Frank Neve
 Johnny Nierynck
 Luc Noé
 Célestin Nollet
 Michel Nollet
 Kenneth Notte
 Patrick Notteboom
 Roger Notteboom
 Camille Nuwel
 Raymond Orban
 Richard Orlans
 Kevin Packet
 Bart Pannecoucke
 Joeri Pardo
 Ernest Patfoort
 André Perot
 Marcel Pertry
 Alfons Pettens
 Philip Piedfort
 Marceau Pillaert
 Franco Pirelli
 Tim Plovie
 Robert Poelvoorde
 Arthur Pollet
 Rudy Poorteman
 René Popelier
 Anthony Portier
 Fernand Proot
 Roger Proot
 Joseph Pruüost
 Maurice Quaghebeur
 Alex Querter
 Camille Quintens
 André Raes
 Thierry Raskin
 René Renson
 Björn Renty
 Carlos Reuse
 Emile Reuse
 Albert Reychler
 Björn Roets
 Marcel Roeykens
 Pierre Roggeman
 Marin Roje
 Albéric Roose
 André Roose
 Albert Ruysschaert
 Arthur Ruysschaert
 Willy Ryckebusch
 Adrien Ryde
 Etienne Ryde
 Joeri Sabbe
 André Saeys
 Louis Saeys
 Sylvain Saeys
 Luc Sanders
 Paul Sanders
 Carlos Scheerens
 Achille Schelstraete
 Philippe Schepens
 Jacques Schoofs
 André Schoonbaert
 Georges Schotte
 Pierre Schotte
 Roger Schotte
 Paul Schouppe
 Björn Sengier
 Tony Sergeant
 Robert Serru
 Ronny Sierens
 Jan Simoen
 Roger Simoens
 François Simoens
 Franky Simon
 Willy Sinack
 Thierry Siquet
 Alphonse Six
 Jules Six
 Julien Six
 Adi Slabbinck
 André Snauwaert
 Kristof Snelders
 Kurt Soenens
 Ghislain Somers
 Robert Somers
 Maurice Soyez
 Alessio Staelens
 Fabrice Staelens
 Sébastien Stassin
 Steve Stellamans
 Johan Sterckx
 Jan Steyaert
 Dirk Stock
 Andy Stroy
 Carlos Strubbe
 Fernand Strubbe
 Jean Strubbe
 Maurice Strypsteen
 Modeste Suvée
 Walter Swimberghe
 Joris Tavernier
 Emmanuel Talloen
 Albert Tanghe
 Günther Tanghe
 Gilbert Thibaut de Maisières
 Guy Thys
 Arthur Timmerman
 Etienne Timmerman
 Charles Traen
 Octave Traen
 Louis Trypsteen
 Nico Vaesen
 Willy Van Acker
 Edgard Van Bocxstaele
 Emile Van Cappel
 Albert Van Cleynenbreugel
 Albert Van Coile
 André Vandamme
 Camiel Van Damme
 Jens Van Damme
 Léon Van de Vijver
 Richard Van de Walle
 Serge Van de Walle
 Silveer Vanden Berghe
 Aimé Vanden Weghe
 Johan Vandenabeele
 Marc Van den Abeele
 Hans Van Den Broeck
 Gregoire Vandenbroele
 Bram Vandenbussche
 Francky Vandendriessche
 Hugo Vandenheede
 Michel Vanderbauwhede
 Luc Vanderbeken
 Jozef Vandercruyssen
 Delphin Vanderhaeghen
 Yves Vanderhaeghe
 Jan van der Hoeven
 Luc Vanderschommen
 Jan Vanderweeën
 Eric Vandewiele
 Jan Vandyck
 Wim Vandycke
 Léon Van Eeghem
 Carlos Van Eenoo
 Geert Van Eenoo
 Lukas Van Eenoo
 Kris Vangaever
 Richard Van Gassen
 Franky Vanhaecke
 Flavien Vanhalme
 Florimond Vanhalme
 Marcel Vanhalme
 Cyrille Van Haverbeke
 Jozef Vanhecke
 Hendrik Van Hende
 Eugeen Van Hoorickx
 Léopold Van Hoorickx
 Erwin Vanhoucke
 Willy Vanhoucke
 Frans Vanhoutte
 Koen Van Hove
 André Vanhullebus
 Edmond Van Iseghem
 Marc Van Iseghem
 Joseph Van Kersschaever
 Marc Vanlancker
 André Van Lommel
 Daniël Van Loo
 Willy Van Loo
 Albert Van Loocke
 Achille Van Maele
 Dominique Vanmaele
 Fernand Van Middel
 Tom Van Mol
 Eric Vanoverbeke
 Urbain Van Pottelberghe
 Henri Vanpoucke
 Julien Vanpoucke
 Walter Van Poucke
 Kristoff Van Robays
 Médard Van Rolleghem
 Karel Van Roose
 Medard Vansteenkiste
 Jef Vanthournout
 Joseph Van Tomme
 Joseph Van Vlaenderen
 Robert Van Vlaenderen
 Frans Van Walleghem
 Joseph Van Wassenhove
 Bram Verbist
 André Verbruggen
 Edmond Verbruggen
 John Vercammen
 Luc Vercammen
 Robert Vercruysse
 Fabio Vergucht
 Bernard Verheecke
 Jan Verhelst
 Marc Verheye
 Roger Verkeyn
 Raoul Verleye
 Julien Vermeersch
 Maurice Vermeersch
 René Vermeersch
 Charles Vernimme
 Camille Verriest
 Jules Verriest
 Aimé Verstraete
 Edmond Verté
 Igor Vetokele
 Denis Viane
 Albert Vollekindt
 Jelle Vossen
 Raphaël Vyncke
 Gustaaf Wardenier
   Josip Weber
 Edouard Weghsteen
 Willy Wellens
 Alfred Willems
 Didier Wittebole
 Dieter Wittesaele
 Gilbert Wittevrongel
 Robert Wittevrongel
 Etienne Wybaillie
 Roger Wybo
 Marcel Zanders
 Pieter Zeenaeme

Bosnia and Herzegovina
 Alen Avdić
 Milenko Milošević
 Nenad Mišković

Brazil
  Geo Carvalho
 Carlos Dos Santos
 Roberto Gambasi
 Fabio Giuntini
 Kanu
 Marcos Lucas
 Renato Neto
 Reynaldo
 Robson Saint Clair
 Leandro Simioni

Cameroon
 Christian Makoun Sr.
 Sanda Sanda

China
 Wang Yang

Democratic Republic of the Congo
  Didier Bapupa
 Nicaise Kudimbana
 Raphaël N'Zoko
 Polo Nzuzi
 Jerry Tondelua

Côte d'Ivoire
 Armand Mahan

Croatia
 Branko Karačić
 Jerko Tipurić

Czech Republic
 Vít Valenta
 Roman Vonášek

Denmark
 Christian Andersen
 Erhard Auerbach
 Ole Budtz
 Michael Gernsø
 Benny Nielsen
 Morten Olsen
 Robert Skibsted
 Søren Skov

England
 Basil Cowan
 Brian Etheridge
 Luke Jones
 Alfred Kennedy
 Randolph Richards
 Richard Saker
 Jerome Watt

Finland
 Kari Laukkanen
 Paulus Roiha
 Kari Ukkonen

France
 Franck Bernhard
  Mohamed Berthé
  Philippe Durpes
  Christophe Grondin
 Mehdi Makhloufi
 Albert Milleville
 Stéphane Narayaninnaiken
 Didier Six

Germany
 Max Höllriegel
 Peter Közle
  Angelo Maraldo
 Günter Nasdalla
 Sergio Peter
 Jürgen Todebusch
 Andreas Wagner

Ghana
  Isaac Asare
  Kofi Mbeah
  William Osei Berkoe
 William Owusu

Guinea
 Kader Camara

Haiti
 Carlens Arcus

Hungary
 László Hársányi
 Zoltán Locskai
 Gyula Nemes
 Gábor Torma

Iceland
 Sævar Jónsson
 Ragnar Margeirsson
 Arnar Vidarsson

Republic of Ireland
 Dominic Foley

Republic of Macedonia
 Igor Gjuzelov
 Jurica Siljanoski

Malawi
 Kennedy Malunga
 Frank Sinalo

Mali
 Abdoulaye Camara

Mauritius
 Ned Charles

Mexico
  Teun Wilke

Montenegro
 Bojan Božović
 Milan Purović

Morocco
 Nacer Abdellah

Netherlands

 Wouter Artz
 Aimé Baas
 Leendert Barth
 Aschwin Christina
 Steven De Croock
 Jan de Koning
 Peter De Quant
 Luciano Dompig
  Cyrus Dos Santos
 Arjan Human
  Virgall Joemankhan
 Wim Kooiman
 Gerrie Kleton
 Kees Krijgh
 Tommy Krommendijk
 Ibad Muhamadu
  Brian Pinas
 Ricky Talan
 Robert Van Der Schildt
 Arthur Van Huizen
 Bram Van Kerkhof
 Hennie Van Nee
 Hans Van Someren
 Wietse Veenstra
 Adri Versluys

Nigeria
 Muisi Ajao
 Osahon Eboigbe

Northern Ireland
 Tony Kane

Norway
 Frode Fermann
 Jan Ove Pedersen

Peru
 José Carlos Fernández

Poland
 Ernest Konon
 Zbigniew Swietek

Portugal
  Amido Baldé
 Nuno Reis
  Rudi
 William Da Silva Carvalho

Romania
 Marius Cheregi
 Ovidiu Hanganu
 Ion Ionescu
 Dorinel Munteanu
 Tibor Selymes
 Ilie Stan

Russia
 Mikhail Karassev
  Vahram Kevorkian

Senegal
 Papa Sene

Serbia
 Aleksandar Mutavdžić
 Darko Pivaljević
 Slobodan Slović
 Đorđe Svetličić

Sierra Leone
  Mohamed Kanu

Slovakia
 Tomáš Labun

Slovenia
 Dejan Kelhar

Spain
  Gregorio Bahamonde

Ukraine
  Oleg Iachtchouk
  Serhiy Serebrennikov

Yugoslavia
  Zoran Bojović
  Zoran Ivšić
  Ivo Jerolimov
  Hajrudin Rovčanin
  Zdenko Vukasović

Zambia
 Joe Bwalya
 Kalusha Bwalya
 Charly Musonda

Zimbabwe
 Honour Gombami
 Vusumuzi Nyoni
 Obadiah Tarumbwa

Top 50 most appearances

As of match played 29 May 2011 in which the names in bold means that these players are still active for Cercle Brugge.

Top 50 most goals

As of match played 29 May 2011 and according to www.cerclemuseum.be. Names in bold means that these players are still active for Cercle Brugge.

See also
 Cercle Brugge K.S.V.

References

External links
 Cercle Brugge official website 
 Cerclemuseum.be 

Cercle Brugge K.S.V.
Cercle Brugge
 
Association football player non-biographical articles